Ortho Pedal is a Alburtis, Pennsylvania-based company that manufactures a trademarked product, Ortho Pedal, which replaces bicycle pedals and assists individuals with arthritis and other knee-related conditions in riding a bicycle.

History
In Spring 2016, Ortho-Pedal, LLC engaged with the Widener University's Small Business Development Center. Seniors in Widener's MGT-451 Senior Project class worked with Ortho-Pedal, LLC for 15 weeks. The project was titled "Gearing Up for Growth: An Updated Business Plan” prepared for the Widener University School of Business Administration by students Samuel Billbrough, Louis Crispi, Douglas Fisher, Jie Liang, William Morgan, Ian Prahar-Ryals, and Ryan Raiker, (Faculty Advisor: Professor Peter Hornberger, SBDC Advisor: Qadree Counsel (Graduate Assistant), and Lenin Agudo (Primary Consultant), Entrepreneur/Sponsor: William Moseley and Pamela Moseley, Project Board of Directors: Annetta Fortune, Jerry Hionis, Jr., Arthur Schwartz, and Ross Steinman) 

At the end of the semester, the information was presented and a final business plan to was presented to Ortho-Pedal, LLC owner: Bill Moseley, to Widener faculty, administrators and other students. Their efforts paid off as Moseley has since increased sales by 300% as of September 2016.

References

External links 

Companies based in Lehigh County, Pennsylvania
American brands
Bicycle parts
Widener University